Timofei Hordeichik (born 4 January 1986) is a Belarusian diver. He competed for Belarus at the 2012 Summer Olympics in the men's 10 m platform diving.

He and teammate Vadim Kaptur won the bronze medal in the men's 10 m synchronised diving at the 2010 European Aquatics Championships.  This pair have also won medals at Grand Prix level.

References

Belarusian male divers
Divers at the 2012 Summer Olympics
Olympic divers of Belarus
1986 births
Living people
Sportspeople from Minsk